The Tip is a 1918 American short comedy film featuring Harold Lloyd. Distributed by the Pathé Exchange, the film was released in US cinemas on January 6. The film was shown in France on March 7, 1919 under the title "Lui et la voyante". In the United States a re-edition was made to the film  in 1921. Copies of the film are preserved in the archives of the International Museum of Photography and Film at George Eastman House and in private collections.

Cast

 Harold Lloyd 
 Snub Pollard 
 Bebe Daniels 
 W.L. Adams
 William Blaisdell
 Sammy Brooks
 Harry Frick
 Marie Gilbert
 William Gillespie
 Max Hamburger
 Oscar Larson
 Gus Leonard
 Chris Lynton
 M.J. McCarthy
 Belle Mitchell
 Marie Mosquini
 Fred C. Newmeyer
 Lottie Novello
 Evelyn Page
 Hazel Powell
 Dorothy Saulter
 Nina Speight
 Charles Stevenson
 William Strohbach - (as William Strawback)
 Robert Van Meter
 Dorothea Wolbert

See also
 Harold Lloyd filmography

References

External links

1918 films
1918 comedy films
1918 short films
American silent short films
American black-and-white films
Films directed by Gilbert Pratt
Films with screenplays by H. M. Walker
American comedy short films
1910s American films
Silent American comedy films